Mario Acchini (3 May 1915 – 24 April 1991) was an Italian rower. He competed in the 1948 Summer Olympics. Ezio Acchini was his cousin.

References

1915 births
1991 deaths
Rowers at the 1948 Summer Olympics
Italian male rowers
Olympic rowers of Italy
Sportspeople from Varese
European Rowing Championships medalists
20th-century Italian people